Michael Vincent (born Michael Vincent Louis on 14 February 1964) is a British magician. He won The Magic Circle's Close-up Magician of the Year award three times (1983, 1991 and 2003).

Biography 
He first became interested in magic in 1970, after watching magicians David Nixon, Doug Henning, Fred Kaps and Slydini perform on television. He was later mentored by escapologist and magician Alan Alan and studied with Slydini for 4 days. In an interview with DMC, Michael is quoted as saying, "This happened over a four day period. Never saw him again." "In that week, it was a mixture of Dingle, time at Harry Lorayne's place, time with Slydini, time with Richard Kauffman." Vincent joined London's Magic Circle and was eventually awarded a life-membership of the club's Inner Magic Circle, with a Gold Star (for performing excellence).

In 2001, Vincent made the national newspapers in the United Kingdom, when he was hired by Scotland Yard to give a course to 20 top police chiefs involving the use of magic tricks to demonstrate communication skills.
He performed at Hollywood's Magic Castle in 2003, and his television appearances have included, Jim'll Fix It, The Paul Daniels Magic Show, Test the Nation (BBC 1) and Heroes of Magic - A Century of Wonder (Channel 4)

In 2011, Michael suffered from sudden overnight hearing loss leaving him partially deaf, a condition which remains to this day.

Although he did not outfox Penn & Teller with either of his magic tricks, he nevertheless won praise for his classical technique and exemplary sleight of hand and was regarded by Penn as one of his favorite performers.

Awards 
 Ron Macmillan's International Magic Studio Magician of the Year 1994
 The Magic Circle Close up Magician of the Year 1983, 1991, 2003

Works 
The Tapestry of Deception Part 1 DVD – The Introduction
The Tapestry of Deception Part 2 DVD – The Power of Assumptions
The Tapestry of Deception Part 3 DVD – Professional Card Magic
The Tapestry of Deception Part 4 DVD – The Evolution of a Classic
The Tapestry of Deception Part 5 DVD – The Poetry of Conjuring
The Joy of Magic DVD
The Sleight of Hand Artistry of Michael Vincent DVD
Close-up Classics Booklet
3 Professional Card Routines Booklet
The Tapestry of Deception Booklet + DVD
The Classic Magic of Michael Vincent, Volume 1 – The Pathway To Excellence DVD (Trilogy)
The Classic Magic of Michael Vincent, Volume 2 – Rhapsodies In Silver and Other Mysteries DVD (4 Vols.)
The Classic Magic of Michael Vincent, Volume 3 – Elegant Deceptions DVD (Trilogy)
The Classic Magic of Michael Vincent, Volume 4 – The Quest for Mastery DVD (4 Vols.)
Dual Control Revisited DVD – Michael Vincent's version of Alan Alan's astonishing magic
The One Shuffle Finale – As seen on Penn & Teller's: FOOL US Booklet

References

Sources
Bennetto, Jason, "Police hire magician to teach them some new tricks", The Independent, 28 April 2001. Accessed via subscription.
Calvi, Nuala, Features: Michael Vincent, The Stage, 8 July 2005
Clinton, Jane, "A new trick to cure illness", The Express on Sunday, 10 December 2006. Accessed via subscription.
The Daily Telegraph, "Magician shows top police how to network", 13 June 2001.
Davis, Mandy, Review: Test the Nation, BBC 1 22 December 2003, Magic Week, December 2003.
Dawes, Edwin A. and Bailey, Michael (eds.), Circle Without End: The Magic Circle 1905 - 2005, Jeremy Mills Publishing, 2005, 
James, Julian (AIMC), "Interview with Michael Vincent", The Magic Circular (magazine of The Magic Circle), March/April 2002.
The Voice, "The Magic Touch: Michael Vincent left the Post Office for showbusiness", 18 April 2004.
Tiberio Álvarez Echeverri, E. ('Maqroll el Magiero'), "Michael Vincent: Una lección de comportamiento mágico", Ilusiones, reprinted with permission on Portal de Magia, February 2009 (in Spanish).

External links
Michael Vincent Magic
Michael Vincent's YouTube Channel

British magicians
1964 births
Living people